Silver Hills Public School, Kozhikode, is a Christian minority institution under the management of CMI Fathers of St. Thomas Province, Kozhikode, who run several educational institutions at all levels in India and abroad. The CMI society was founded by Blessed Kuriakose Elias Chavara. Today the 38-year-old school offers 10+2 year pattern of education under both the Kerala state syllabus and also the C.B.S.E. syllabus with recognition up to class XII. The patron of the school is Blessed Kuriakose Elias Chavara. The school presently has about 1500 students and 65 teachers.
Two institutions constitute Silver Hills School - Silver Hills Higher Secondary School and Silver Hills Public School, with state and C.B.S.E. syllabus respectively. The principal of the former school is Fr. Biju John Vellakkada, while the latter is headed by Fr. John Mannarathara.

In 2005 and 2007, the school won C.B.S.E. Kalotsav, a cultural festival organised by Sahodaya Schools Complex of Malabar Region.

Notable alumni
 Vinod Scaria, genomics scientist
 Sandra Soman, Miss CosmoWorld 2019
 Rudraksh Sudheesh, Actor 
 Merin Gregory, Singer
 Keerthana SK, Singer 
 Akhila Mohan, Actress

References

External links
 Silver Hills Higher Secondary School
 Silver Hills Public School
 Silver Hills Public School Online

Schools in Kozhikode
High schools and secondary schools in Kerala